Lawa Antino Airstrip  is an airstrip serving the gold mining concessions near the town of Benzdorp in Suriname.

Charters and destinations 
Charter Airlines serving this airport are:

Notable disasters 
On April 3, 2008, an airplane operated by Blue Wing Airlines crashed upon landing at the Lawa Antino Airport near Benzdorp in which 19 people in total (2 crew, 17 passengers) were killed.

See also

 List of airports in Suriname
 Transport in Suriname

References

External links
OpenStreetMap - Antino

Airports in Suriname
Brokopondo District